South Western Districts, known as SW Districts or SWD, is a South African first class cricket team based in the Western Cape city of Oudtshoorn, representing approximately the eastern half of Western Cape province. They form part of the Cape Cobras franchise, and play their home games at the Oudtshoorn Recreation Ground.

Playing history
South Western Districts played their inaugural first-class match in the Currie Cup in 1904 at Mossel Bay against Western Province but did not play another first-class match for 102 years.

The South Western Districts Cricket Board was granted associate status by Cricket South Africa in 2004 and the team has taken part in the Provincial Three-Day Challenge and Provincial One-Day Challenge competitions since the 2006-07 season. It was upgraded to full affiliate status in 2013 and as of early December 2020 South Western Districts had played 143 first-class matches for 37 wins, 53 losses and 53 draws and 111 List A matches for 52 wins, 57 losses, one tie and one no-result.

Honours
 South African Airways Provincial Three-Day Challenge (0)
 South African Airways Provincial One-Day Challenge (0)

Squad
The team's coach for the 2019–20 domestic season was the former Griqualand West and Eagles all-rounder Alan Kruger. He succeeded Baakier Abrahams, who coached the team for the previous three seasons.

In April 2021, Cricket South Africa confirmed the following squad ahead of the 2021–22 season.

 Jean du Plessis
 Hanno Kotze
 Renaldo Meyer
 Sintu Majeza
 Jhedli van Briesies
 Marcello Piedt
 Andre Malan
 Blayde Capell
 Yaseen Valli
 Onke Nyaku
 Sean Whitehead

References

External sources
 SWD Cricket website
 South Western Districts at Cricket Archive

Sources
 South African Cricket Annual – various editions
 Wisden Cricketers' Almanack – various editions

South African first-class cricket teams
Cricket in the Western Cape